Katrin Scholz (born 13 March 1969) is a German classical violinist.

Life 
Born in Kleinmachnow, Scholz visited the Konzerthausorchester Berlin. After finishing school she studied at the Hochschule für Musik "Hanns Eisler" with Werner Scholz and at the conservatory in Bern with Igor Ozim.

Scholz was a soloist with the Berlin Symphony Orchestra, the Dresden Philharmonic, the MDR Radio Symphony Orchestra Leipzig, the German Radio Philharmonic Saarbrücken, the Rundfunk-Sinfonieorchester Berlin, the New Japan Philharmonic and the Yomiuri Nippon Symphony Orchestra. She has worked with the conductors Gerd Albrecht, Vladimir Fedosseyev, Gabriel Feltz, Vladimir Jurowski, Alexander Lazarev, Hannu Lintu, Miguel Gómez- Martínez, Ryosuke Numajiri, Eiji Ōue, Michael Sanderling, Peter Schreier and Ulf Schirmer.

Since 1995 she has also given concerts in double function as conductor and soloist of the Kammerorchester Berlin in European countries as well as in Japan, the USA, Brazil, Argentina, Chile, Ecuador, Peru and Colombia.

In October 1998, at the age of 29, Katrin Scholz was appointed full professor at the Hochschule für Künste Bremen.

Awards 
 1st Prize International Music Competition Japan 1989 
 1st Prize International Violin Competition Cologne 1991

Recordings 
 1995: Show Pieces (Sarasate, Saint-Saens, Chausson), JVC Victor Entertainment
 1995: Brahms: Sonaten 1-3 (Gerald Fauth, Klavier), JVC Victor Entertainment
 1998: Mozart: Violinkonzerte 1-5, 2 Rondi + Adagio, (Kammerorchester Berlin), Berlin Classics / JVC
 1999: Franck/Respighi: Sonaten (Gerald Fauth, Klavier), JVC/WDR
 1999: Spanish Dance (Sarasate, de Falla, Granados, Stschedrin), Gerald Fauth, Klavier, Berlin Classics
 2000: Saint-Saëns, Martinů: Violinkonzerte Nr. 3+2 (Hamburger Symphoniker, Sebastian Lang-Lessing), Berlin Classics
 2003: Haydn: alle Violinkonzerte (Kammerorchester Berlin), Berlin Classics
 2004: Haydn: Doppelkonzert Violine/Cembalo, Abschiedssinfonie, Mozart: Divertimento D, Nachtmusik (Kammerorchester Berlin) Berlin Classics
 2005: Beethoven/Bruch: Violinkonzerte (Kammerorchester Berlin, Michael Sanderling), Berlin Classics
 2007: Brahms/Sibelius: Violinkonzerte (Rundfunk-Sinfonieorchester Berlin, Kammerorchester Berlin, Michael Sanderling), Berlin Classis / JVC
 2008: Bach: Brandenburgische Konzerte 2-5 (Kammerorchester Berlin), JVC / Victor Entertainment

References

External links 
 
 

German classical violinists
Women violinists
1969 births
Living people
People from Brandenburg